Ibrahim Jassam Mohammed is an Iraqi photojournalist who was arrested in Iraq in September 2008 because he was considered "a threat to the security of Iraq and coalition forces" by U.S. and Iraqi forces. He was working for multiple agencies including Reuters at the time of his arrest.

An Iraqi court concluded on November 30, 2008 that there is no evidence against photojournalist Ibrahim Jassam Mohammed, and ordered him released from U.S. military custody, but the U.S. military in Iraq refused to release him.

Jassam was released from custody on 10 February 2010.

References

Living people
Year of birth missing (living people)